The Okinawa Classic was a men's professional golf tournament that was held at Daikyo Country Club in Itoman, Okinawa, Japan from 1973 until 1975.

Winners

References

Defunct golf tournaments in Japan
Sports competitions in Okinawa Prefecture
Recurring sporting events established in 1973
Recurring sporting events disestablished in 1975